Jones Stewart Hamilton (April 19, 1833 – January 21, 1907) was an American sheriff, state senator, businessman and Confederate veteran who became a millionaire through investments in railroads run by convicts he leased after the war. His mansion is the namesake of Belhaven University.

Early life
Jones S. Hamilton was born on April 19, 1833, in Wilkinson County, Mississippi. His parents were William Hamilton and Eliza Stewart (the daughter of Lieutenant Governor Duncan Stewart), and he was of Scottish descent. He graduated from Centenary College in Jackson, Louisiana.

Career
Hamilton began his career as the sheriff of Wilkinson County from 1854 to 1858. He served in the Confederate States Army during the American Civil War.

Hamilton made money through convict leasing after the war. According to the Arkansas Gazette, "As lessee of state penitentiary for years he was identified with many public works." He "owned the Jackson gas works, a race track, and a number of hotels." He was also a publisher of The Clarion Ledger in 1865–1867, and a co-founder of the Gulf and Ship Island Railroad in the early 1880s. He became a millionaire through his investments in railroads, which were run by the convicts he leased. As a result, he has been described as a "southern-style robber baron."

Hamilton was criticized for his use of convict leasing by Roderick Gambrell, a newspaper editor. On May 5, 1887, the two men fought it out in a duel by gunfire, leading to Gambrell's death. Even though duels were illegal in Mississippi, Hamilton was declared "not guilty" on April 9, 1888.

Hamilton served as a member of the Mississippi State Senate, representing Hinds County from 1884 to 1888.

Personal life, death and legacy
Hamilton married Caroline Augusta Stewart in 1856 and they had a son and a daughter. His wife died in 1861. He married his second wife, Fannie Buck, in 1877; they had four sons and a daughter.

Hamilton died on January 21, 1907, in Jackson, Mississippi. He donated his Jackson mansion, Belhaven, to Belhaven College (now known as Belhaven University); the mansion burnt down in 1895 but the university retains its name. By extension, it is also the namesake of the Belhaven Neighborhood where it was located.

References

External links

1833 births
1907 deaths
American people of Scottish descent
People from Wilkinson County, Mississippi
Businesspeople from Jackson, Mississippi
Centenary College of Louisiana alumni
Confederate States Army personnel
Mississippi sheriffs
Mississippi state senators
Belhaven University
19th-century American politicians
19th-century American businesspeople